Over Your Head is a home improvement reality television series first broadcast on HGTV on November 4, 2006, hosted by Eric Stromer.

References

2006 American television series debuts
2000s American reality television series
2010s American reality television series
English-language television shows
HGTV original programming